San Francisco is an American monthly magazine devoted to the people, culture, food, politics, and arts of the San Francisco Bay Area. It is published monthly by Modern Luxury publications.

History
There have been two separate San Francisco magazines published in San Francisco. One was started in the 1970s and published for many years, under a series of different publishers, until it went out of business around 1985.

The magazine known as San Francisco has its roots starting in 1955, when San Francisco public broadcasting station KQED-TV began publishing a programming guide called KQED in Focus. The program guide began to add more articles and took on the character of a regular magazine. The name was later changed to Focus Magazine and then to San Francisco Focus. In 1984, a new programming guide, Fine Tuning was separated off from Focus, with Focus carrying on as a self-contained magazine.

San Francisco Focus was the recipient of a National Headliner Award for feature writing in 1993.  In 1996, KQED sold San Francisco Focus to Diablo Publications in order to pay off debts.  The magazine was spun off into an independent entity in January 1997. In October 1997, the magazine re-branded itself as simply San Francisco. In 1999, new management took over and Editor-In-Chief Bruce Kelley arrived in June 2000. Under Kelley's leadership, San Francisco has won two of the magazine publishing industry's most prestigious award, National Magazine awards for General Excellence (2010, 2018), and it has garnered three Maggies as Best City and Regional Magazine from the Western Publications Association (2006, 2007 and 2009). In 2005, San Francisco was sold to Modern Luxury Media (a nationwide conglomerate of city and lifestyle magazines).

Steven Dinkelspiel stepped to the head of San Francisco magazine as the publisher in March 1999 after working as both circulation director and general counsel for the magazine. After the merge of the magazine with Modern Luxury, he became its president. Jon Steinberg became editor-in-chief of the magazine in February 2012, before which he was a Senior Editor at New York magazine.

In April 2019, Modern Luxury announced that Walter J. Kupiec, a media and marketing veteran, was hired as Market President and Publisher.

Michael McCarthy is the current editor-in-chief.

Awards
American Society of Magazine Editors (ASME)
 Winner, General Excellence, 2018
 Finalist, Personal Service: "The New School of Fish," by Erik Vance, 2012
 Finalist, General Excellence (Special Interest Magazines), 2011
 Winner, General Excellence, 2010
 Finalist, Public Interest: "War of Values," by Danelle Morton, 2010 
 Finalist, Public Interest: "Innocence Lost," by Nina Martin, November 2004
 Finalist, Public Interest: "Trouble in the Presidio," by Kerry Tremain, December 2001
City & Regional Magazine Awards (CRMA)
 Gold Award, Civic Journalism: "Innocence Lost," by Nina Martin, November 2004
 Bronze Award, General Excellence, 2003
 Bronze Award, Reporting: "The Brobeck Mutiny," July 2003
 Bronze Award, Special Issue: "Think Green," June 2003
 Silver Award, Special Issue: "Our Dot-com Decade: What Really Happened," April 2002
 Bronze Award, Reporting: "What Just Happened Here?," April 2002
 Bronze Award, Food and Dining Criticism: Josh Sens's monthly review "Critical Dish" ("The Best Restaurant," July 2002; "Now We're Not Cooking," September 2002; "A Maison of His Own," November 2002)
 Bronze Award for General Criticism: Dana Goia's classical music criticism ("Good Lord!," December 2001; "Glass Appeal," October 2002; "Moulin Rogue," September 2002)

Maggie AwardsAwards by the Western Publications Association in magazine, periodical, and online publishing. 
 Best Feature Article/Consumer: "What Happened to Black San Francisco", Sept. 2006, by Jaimal Yogis
 Best Feature Article/Consumer: "What it Really Means to be Green," June 2003
 Best Regularly Featured Department, Section or Column/Consumer: "City Journal"
 Best City & Metropolitan/Consumer: April 2006
James Beard Awards 
Winner, Best Food and Culture Writing, "The Toxic, Abusive, Addictive, Supportive, Codependent Relationship Between Chefs and Yelpers," Rebecca Flint Marx, August 2014
 Finalist, Best Feature Writing, "King of the Mall," Maile Carpenter, August 2004
 Winner, Best Feature Writing, "Eating in Michael Bauer's Town," Maile Carpenter, August 2001

See also
San Francisco Review of Books

References

External links
 Official site

1955 establishments in California
Lifestyle magazines published in the United States
Local interest magazines published in the United States
Monthly magazines published in the United States
Magazines established in 1955
Magazines published in San Francisco